Scott Pittman (born 9 July 1992) is a Scottish footballer who plays for Livingston as a midfielder.

Background
He is a son of Steve Pittman, who played for Dundee, East Fife and Partick Thistle as a full back, and also represented the United States at international level.

Career
Pittman began his career at Hamilton Academical and on 25 March 2011, he signed on loan for Alloa Athletic. He was first called up for a matchday squad on 26 March 2011, remaining an unused substitute for their goalless home draw with Peterhead in the Scottish Second Division. Three days later, he made his only appearance for the club, as a last-minute substitute for Jim Lister in a 3–2 defeat at Brechin City.

On 11 August 2011, having been released by Hamilton, Pittman signed for junior club Broxburn Athletic, managed by his father. He later continued his junior career with Bo'ness United joining the club in June 2014.

On 3 February 2015, after three other Scottish Professional Football League teams had made offers, he joined Scottish Championship club Livingston. Four days after his acquisition, he made his debut in a 3–2 home defeat to Heart of Midlothian, playing the final four minutes in place of Ibra Sekajja. On 5 April, Pittman played the full 90 minutes of the 2015 Scottish Challenge Cup Final at McDiarmid Park in Perth, scoring the first goal of a 4–0 win over his former team Alloa. On 24 October 2015, he scored the first league goal of his career, equalising in a 4–1 win at Queen of the South.

On 7 May 2018, in the first leg of the Scottish Premiership play-off semi-final, Pittman scored the winning goal as Livingston won 3–2 away to Dundee United. He scored again in the first leg of the final, getting Livingston's second goal in a 2–1 win at home against Partick Thistle. He also played in the second leg as Livingston won 1–0 to complete a 3–1 aggregate victory to gain promotion to the Scottish Premiership.

On 22 March 2019, Pittman signed a new contract, keeping him at Livingston until 2021.

Honours
Livingston
Scottish Challenge Cup: 2014–15
Scottish League One: 2016–17

Career statistics

References

External links
 
 

1992 births
Living people
Scottish footballers
Association football forwards
Hamilton Academical F.C. players
Alloa Athletic F.C. players
Broxburn Athletic F.C. players
Bo'ness United F.C. players
Livingston F.C. players
Scottish Football League players
Scottish Professional Football League players
Scottish people of American descent
Scotland junior international footballers
Scottish Junior Football Association players
Footballers from West Lothian
People from Pumpherston